Monument to Alexander Suvorov is a monument to a Russian Generalissimo Alexander Vasilyevich Suvorov in the city of Azov, Rostov Oblast, Russia. It was installed in 2014 on the territory of Powder Cellar Museum.

History 
Rosotv Oblast has about a dozen monuments to Alexander Suvorov. His name is given to the streets and several educational institutions. The name of Suvorov is also linked with the history of Azov. In the years 1778-1779, Alexander Suvorov inspected the construction of Azov-Mozdok defense line, which was laid down after Russo-Turkish War of 1768-1774. Several times he visited Azov fortress. The main operations in this Russian-Turkish war were conducted under the command of Suvorov.

At the petition of Suvorov to Empress Catherine II, the Crimean Armenians began to settle on the Don. There they founded the city of Nakhichevan-on-Don, the villages of Crimea, Chaltyr, Bolshiye Saly, Sultan-Saly, Nesvetay.

On July 19, 2014 in the city of Azov there was installed a monument to Suvorov. The date of the opening was timed to anniversary of Azov's final accession to the Russian Empire. The monument was erected on the territory Powder Cellar Museum.

Description 
The bust of Suvorov is mounted on a rectangular pedestal. It is installed next to the 18th century building of military engineering, a powder cellar. Next to the powder cellar there is a house where the commander stayed at his time. The pedestal has an inscription: " Alexander Vasilyevich Suvorov 1730-1800. The great Russian military commander, Generalissimo, Prince of Italy, Count Ryminsky. " On all sides of the monument there a plaques that tell about his life. There are two old cannons around the monument.

Literature 
(in Russian)
 Агуренко Б. Александр Суворов, гениальный полководец/ Б. Агуренко// Вечерний Ростов.- 2002.- 4 февр.-С. 2.
 Бормотов В. «Потомство мое прошу брать мой пример»/ В. Бормотов// Резонанс.- 1999.- № 10.
 Вартанов Э. Он был необъяснимым чудом/ Э. Вартанов// Наше время.- 2010.- 22 янв.
 Корольченко А. В крепости Ростовской/ А. Корольченко//Приазовский край.- 1993.- 19 авг.
 Рудик Ю. Из фельдмаршалов – в генералиссимусы/Ю. Рудик// Вечерний Ростов.-1999.- 1 марта.
 Чеботарев В. Александр Суворов на Дону и Северном Кавказе/ В. Чеботарев// Приазовский край.- 2005.- 24 нояб.

External links 
 Opening of the monument to Alexander Suvorov in Azov 21.07.14
 Alexander Suvorov in Azov.
 A monument to Alexander Suvorov was installed in Azov

2014 establishments in Russia
Monuments and memorials in Rostov Oblast
Busts in Russia